Nowa Nowa railway station was a railway station on the Orbost railway line. It was opened on Monday, 10 April 1916 to serve the small town of Nowa Nowa. It closed in 1987.

The station site remains just north of the realigned East Gippsland Rail Trail, which follows the route of the former rail line, with the station site itself now used as an emergency helicopter landing place.

It was dis-established as a staff station on 25 July 1986, with the staff and ticket sections Bairnsdale - Bruthen, Bruthen - Nowa Nowa, and Nowa Nowa - Orbost abolished, and replaced with a single staff and ticket section; Bairnsdale - Orbost.

References

Disused railway stations in Victoria (Australia)
Transport in Gippsland (region)
Shire of East Gippsland